is a Sapporo Municipal Subway station in Toyohira-ku, Sapporo, Hokkaido, Japan. The station is numbered "N13". It is one of the four Sapporo Municipal Subway stations located above-ground (all of them are at the south terminus of the Namboku Line).

Platforms

Surrounding area
 National Route 453, (to Date)
 Hiragishi Cemetery
 Hiragishi Hill Park
 Hokkaido Television Broadcasting (HTB)
 Sapporo Hiragishi Pool
 Toyohira Hiragishi Post Office
 Toyohira Hiragishiminami Police Station
 Sapporo City Agricultural Cooperative Association (JA Sapporo), Hiragishiminami branch

External links

 Sapporo Subway Stations

Railway stations in Japan opened in 1971
Railway stations in Sapporo
Sapporo Municipal Subway
Toyohira-ku, Sapporo